Emil Haussmann (11 October 1910 – 31 July 1947) was a German SS functionary during the Nazi era. He was part of Einsatzkommando 12 of Einsatzgruppe D, which perpetrated the Holocaust in occupied Ukraine. Haussmann was charged with crimes against humanity in 1947 in the Einsatzgruppen Trial. Two days after his indictment, Haussmann committed suicide.

Life
Emil Haussmann was the son of an accountant in Ravensburg. He joined the Nazi Party in January 1930—three years before the Machtergreifung—at the age of 19. Haussmann was a grade school teacher. In 1937, he became a full-time employee of the Sicherheitsdienst (SD), and took over the  Southwest, based in the Judenreferat in Stuttgart.

During the invasion of Poland, Haussmann was part of Einsatzgruppe VI. There he was the "right hand man" for Albert Rapp, the leader of the Eins. Commanding this Einsatzgruppe was Erich Naumann, who was later a co-defendant of Haussmann. This office coordinated the expulsion of Poles, Ukrainians, and Jews, in Reichsgau Wartheland, Reichsgau Danzig-West Prussia, East Upper Silesia and Aktion Zamosc. Haussmann joined Einsatzkommando 12 during the invasion of the Soviet Union, during which he participated in the mass murder of Jews in Ukraine.

Trial and suicide
In 1947 he was one of 24 defendants at the Einsatzgruppen Trial. On 29 July 1947, he received the indictment along with his co-defendants: (1) crimes against humanity, (2) war crimes, and (3) membership in a criminal organization.  

Two days later, before the arraignment, Haussmann hanged himself in his cell and was removed from the process. Thus, he and Otto Rasch, who was declared unfit for stand trial by medical reasons, were the only defendants at the Einsatzgruppen trial who escaped a sentence.

References

Bibliography
 
 
 Trials of War Criminals Before the Nuernberg Military Tribunals Under Control Council Law No. 10, Vol. 4: United States of America vs. Otto Ohlendorf, et. al. (Case 9: „Einsatzgruppen Case“). US Government Printing Office, District of Columbia 1950. In: „National Archives Microfilm Publications“, NM Series 1874-1946, Microfilm Publication M936. National Archives and Record Service, Washington 1973. (Emil Haussmann in the indictment: p. 14.)

1910 births
1947 suicides
Einsatzgruppen personnel
Nazis who committed suicide in prison custody
SS-Sturmbannführer
Prisoners who died in United States military detention
Holocaust perpetrators in Poland
Holocaust perpetrators in Ukraine
People indicted by the United States Nuremberg Military Tribunals
Nazis who committed suicide in Germany
Suicides by hanging in Germany